Gulch Island is located in the Goldfields-Esperance region of Western Australia. 

Composed of granite, the island is part of the group of islands, islets, and rocks that make up the Recherche Archipelago.

References

Recherche Archipelago